The 1966 William & Mary Indians football team was an American football team that represented the College of William & Mary as a member of the Southern Conference (SoCon) during the 1966 NCAA University Division football season. In their third season under head coach Marv Levy, the Indians compiled a 5–4–1 record with a mark of 4–1–1 in conference play, finishing as SoCon co-champion.

Schedule

References

William and Mary
William & Mary Tribe football seasons
Southern Conference football champion seasons
William